The Plain were a rock band from Murfreesboro, Tennessee.

History

The band formed in the early 1990s, sharing a mutual love of bluesy artists like The Black Crowes, The Allman Brothers, and Led Zeppelin.  Swan Burrus (rhythm guitar, vocals), Mac Burrus (lead guitar), and Justin Meyer (drums) had gigged around Nashville for years as "The Southern Delta Swans", playing at dive bars and pizzerias, talent shows, proms, masonic lodges, parks and house parties—anywhere they wouldn't get carded.

With the addition of Rob Overbey on bass, the lineup was complete.  They changed their name to "The Plain", and their sound was now in place, combining  elements of southern rock, blues, power pop, and classic rock.  By 1995, with Swan, Justin and Mac all enrolled at MTSU, the band began to gig tirelessly around Murfreesboro and Nashville, earning a reputation as one of the area's loudest and unironically hardest-rocking bands.

By 1997, after various lineup changes, the band was done. Mac Burrus went on to join local bands The Katies (Katies singer Jason Moore had been playing bass for the Plain) and Self, Justin Meyer went on to play with Fluid Ounces, and Rob Overbey left for California.  Swan Burrus continued to play in various bands before eventually leaving Murfreesboro as well, and recorded a solo album called "Swan Songs" in 2003. Mac and Swan are also listed as co-writers of the song "Stay Home" which appeared in Shrek.

Stickers with the band's logo—a green and black decal featuring an outline of an airplane—can be found scattered around Murfreesboro to this day.

References

Rock music groups from Tennessee
1990s establishments in Tennessee
Musical groups established in the 1990s